Myiodola is a genus of beetles in the family Cerambycidae, containing the following species:

Myiodola brachyptera
Myiodola calceata
Myiodola distincta
Myiodola flavicollis
Myiodola maculosa
Myiodola perrieri
Myiodola plagiaticollis
Myiodola scalabrii
Myiodola spinicrus

References

Dorcasominae